Rolfe is a masculine given name which is borne by:

 Rolfe Humphries (1894–1969), American poet
 Rolfe Kanefsky (born 1969), American screenwriter and director
 Rolfe Kent (born 1963), British composer
 W. Rolfe Kerr (born 1935), an emeritus general authority of The Church of Jesus Christ of Latter-day Saints
 Rolfe Sedan (1896–1982), American actor

See also
 Rolf, a given name and surname

English-language masculine given names